Caecilia dunni is a species of caecilian in the family Caeciliidae. It is endemic to Ecuador and known from the Amazon basin in Napo and Pastaza Provinces. The specific name dunni honors Emmett Reid Dunn, a prominent American herpetologist. Common name Dunn's caecilian has been coined for it.

Caecilia dunni live subterraneanously in submontane forests. Deforestation is a potential threat to this little known species.

References

dunni
Amphibians of Ecuador
Endemic fauna of Ecuador
Taxa named by Philip Hershkovitz
Amphibians described in 1938
Taxonomy articles created by Polbot